Greeley High School may refer to:

Greeley Central High School in Greeley, Colorado
Greeley West High School in Greeley, Colorado
Greeley High School (Greeley, Nebraska) in Greeley, Nebraska
Horace Greeley High School in Chappaqua, New York